Tracy Jamal Morgan (born November 10, 1968) is an American stand-up comedian, actor, producer, and author. Morgan is best known for his television work, particularly his tenure as a cast member on the NBC sketch comedy series Saturday Night Live from 1996 to 2003, as well as his role as Tracy Jordan in the NBC sitcom 30 Rock from 2006 to 2013, each of which earned him a Primetime Emmy Award nomination. He also starred as Tray Barker in the TBS comedy The Last O.G.

Early life
Morgan was born on November 10, 1968 in Brooklyn and raised in Brooklyn's Marlboro Houses and Tompkins Houses in its Bedford Stuyvesant neighborhood. He is the second of five children of a homemaker, Alicia (née Warden), and Jimmy Morgan, a musician who left the family when Morgan was six years old.

His father named him Tracy in honor of a platoon mate and friend who shipped off to Vietnam with him and was killed in action days later.

The target of bullies as a child, Morgan attended DeWitt Clinton High School. In 1985, at age 17 in his senior year, he learned that his father had contracted HIV from hypodermic needle use. His father died in January 1987, aged 38.

Morgan married his girlfriend Sabina that year  and dropped out of high school just four credits short of his diploma to care for his ailing father. Living on welfare, Morgan sold crack cocaine with limited success, but began earning money performing comedy on the streets after his best friend was murdered. He said in 2009: "He would say to me, 'Yo, Tracy, man, you should be doing comedy.' A week later, he was murdered. And that for me, that was like my Vietnam. I had my survival guilt when I started to achieve success. Why I made it out and some guys didn't."

Morgan embarked on a stand-up comedy career, successfully enough that he "finally moved to a nice community in [The Bronx neighborhood of] Riverdale, from a run-down apartment next to Yankee Stadium in the Bronx."

Career

Morgan made his screen debut playing Hustle Man on the television show Martin. The character sold various items from the "hood", always greeting people with his trademark "What's happ'n, chief?," and had a pet dog he dressed as a rapper. In the 2003 Chris Rock film Head of State, Morgan appeared as a man watching television, often questioning why they are not watching Martin.

Morgan was also a regular cast member on Uptown Comedy Club, a sketch-comedy show filmed in Harlem that aired for two seasons, from 1992 to 1994.

He appeared twice on HBO's Def Comedy Jam.

Morgan joined the cast of the comedy series Saturday Night Live in 1996 (Lorne Michaels chose him over Stephen Colbert in the final round) and performed as a regular until 2003. He returned to host on March 14, 2009, and reprised his roles as Brian Fellow and Astronaut Jones. He then made a guest appearance on the 2011 Christmas show, hosted by Jimmy Fallon, and hosted again on October 17, 2015.

Morgan had his own sitcom, The Tracy Morgan Show, in 2003, which was canceled after one season.

From 2006 to 2013, Morgan was a cast member of the television series 30 Rock, playing the character Tracy Jordan, a caricature of himself. His work on 30 Rock was well-received, and he was nominated for Outstanding Supporting Actor in a Comedy Series at the 2009 Emmy Awards. He returned to the role in July 2020 for a reunion episode during the COVID-19 pandemic that was an upfront special for NBCUniversal.

In 2018, Morgan began starring in the TBS series The Last O.G.It ran for four seasons until 2021.

Morgan appeared in a stand-up special, One Mic, on Comedy Central. He also hosted the first Spike Guys' Choice Awards, which aired on June 13, 2007. In 2003, he was on an episode of Punk'd in which his car was towed from the valet parking. He can be heard as Spoonie Luv on the Comedy Central program Crank Yankers and as Woof in the animated series Where My Dogs At?. He also was the voice of Luis in the animated film Rio.

Morgan acted in commercials for NFL 2K, NBA 2K, and NHL 2K, co-starring with Warren Sapp, Ben Wallace and Jeremy Roenick. He appeared in Adam Sandler's film The Longest Yard as a transgender inmate.

Morgan has hosted the VH1 Hip Hop Honors for two consecutive years, and hosted the 2013 Billboard Music Awards.

Morgan appeared in two episodes of the Animal Planet series Tanked, first having a Jaws-themed shark tank built in the basement of his house, then having a replacement tank built for his giant Pacific octopus.

In July 2019, he hosted the ESPYs in Los Angeles.

In February 2022, the New York Friars Club announced that it would bestow the Entertainment Icon Award on Morgan at the club’s spring gala. Morgan is only the ninth recipient of the prestigious comedy award, and the first Black recipient.

Influences
Morgan has listed Carol Burnett, Lucille Ball, Jackie Gleason, Martin Lawrence, Eddie Murphy, and Richard Pryor as among his primary comedic influences.

Personal life

Family
In 1987, while in high school, Morgan married his girlfriend Sabina. The pair have three sons together. Morgan filed for divorce in August 2009, after having been separated for approximately eight years. Morgan credits one of his sons with having saved him from his alcoholism. Of his extended family, Morgan said in 2009, "I'm estranged from my own mother and most of my family, and I'm not sure that's going to change much."

In September 2011, on the red carpet at the Emmy Awards, Morgan announced he and model Megan Wollover had become engaged six months earlier in San Francisco. Their first child, daughter Maven, was born in New York City on July 2, 2013. Morgan and Wollover married on August 23, 2015. Morgan filed for divorce July 2020.

Health problems
In 1996, Morgan was diagnosed with diabetes mellitus and for years has struggled with alcohol use disorder. Morgan has conceded that many of his own troubles were incorporated within 30 Rock episodes. In early December 2010, Morgan received a kidney transplant necessitated by his diabetes and alcohol use disorder. Morgan admitted that he initially did not take his diabetes seriously but later realized the care for it would end up being a matter of life and death.

Autobiography
On October 20, 2009, Morgan's autobiography, I Am the New Black, was released. The book includes stories about living in Tompkins Projects in Bed-Stuy, Brooklyn, to becoming a cast member on Saturday Night Live. Morgan appeared on National Public Radio's Fresh Air hosted by Terry Gross, at times becoming very emotional about his former life in a New York ghetto.

2014 traffic collision and lawsuit
On June 7, 2014, Morgan was a passenger in a Mercedes Sprinter minibus involved in a six-vehicle crash in New Jersey. Just after 1:00 am the vehicle was traveling northbound on the New Jersey Turnpike near Cranbury, when it was struck from behind by a tractor-trailer operated by Walmart, causing a chain reaction crash. Morgan and three other comedians, including Harris Stanton, along with Morgan's assistant and two limousine company employees, were returning from an engagement at Dover Downs Hotel & Casino in Dover, Delaware, as part of Morgan's "Turn it Funny" stand-up comedy tour. The crash killed Morgan's friend and collaborator, 62-year-old comedian James McNair (Jimmy Mack).

Morgan was taken by helicopter to Robert Wood Johnson University Hospital in New Brunswick, New Jersey, with a broken leg and femur, broken nose, and several broken ribs, and underwent surgery on his leg on June 8. On June 20, 2014, Morgan was released from the hospital and was transferred to a rehabilitation facility to continue recovering from the injuries sustained during the crash. He was released from the rehab center on July 12, 2014.

The driver of the Walmart transport-truck, Kevin Roper of Jonesboro, Georgia, pleaded not guilty to one count of death by auto and four counts of assault by auto. The complaint alleges Roper dozed off and hit Morgan's limousine after swerving to avoid slowed traffic ahead of him. It also argues that Roper had been awake for more than 24 hours before the crash. A preliminary investigation by the National Transportation Safety Board revealed that Roper had been on the clock since 11:20 the previous morning and was very close to the federal limits of 14 hours per day and 11 hours behind the wheel.

On July 10, 2014, Morgan sued Walmart for negligence. The suit alleged that Walmart either knew or should have known that Roper had not slept for more than 24 hours. Morgan filed the suit on behalf of himself, comedian Ardie Fuqua, Morgan's personal assistant Jeffrey Millea, and Millea's wife Krista. Fuqua and Millea were both on the bus with Morgan and injured in the crash, while at the time of the crash, Krista Millea was eight months pregnant, and the suit charges that she suffered loss of consortium due to the injuries suffered by her husband. In September 2014, Walmart in court papers cast partial blame on Morgan and the other victims for not wearing seat belts, a claim both Morgan and his counsel denied, noting that the driver who caused the crash had been charged with vehicular homicide and that the police report stated that seat belts were not an issue in the case.

By October 2014, the actor was still undergoing rehab and required a wheelchair when taking more than "some steps." On May 27, 2015, Walmart settled the lawsuit for a multi-million-dollar amount.

On June 1, 2015, Morgan made his first public appearance since the crash, in an interview with Matt Lauer on Today. In that interview, he appeared lucid but said that "I have my good days and my bad days, where I forgot things," and that he also gets recurring headaches. He also stated that he had no memory of the crash. Morgan made a surprise appearance at the 67th Primetime Emmy Awards on September 20, and was greeted with a standing ovation. He then hosted an episode of Saturday Night Live on October 17, 2015. On the November 3, 2016 episode of Conan, Morgan said that he was no longer angry about the collision and had forgiven Roper. The driver of the Walmart truck, Roper, accepted a plea deal in which he pleaded guilty but would serve no jail time. Roper was sentenced to pay undisclosed amounts of fines, serve 300 hours of community service, and serve probation. Morgan's 2017 Netflix standup special Staying Alive joked about Walmart and the lawsuit, while detailing his hospitalization, rehab and recovery.

Controversies
On January 27, 2011, Morgan appeared on the NBA on TNT pregame coverage of the Miami Heat and the New York Knicks nationally televised live basketball game. During the appearance, commentators Charles Barkley and Kenny Smith asked Morgan to choose between Sarah Palin and Tina Fey regarding who was better looking (Fey, Morgan's 30 Rock co-star, portrays Palin on Saturday Night Live). Morgan said Palin was "good masturbation material," for which TNT apologized on live camera.

During a performance in Nashville, Tennessee, on June 3, 2011, Morgan made remarks about homosexuals, reportedly stating that if his son were gay, his son better speak to him like a man or he would "pull out a knife and stab him." Morgan apologized, saying that he had "gone too far." NBC Entertainment head Bob Greenblatt stated, "I speak for NBC and myself personally when I say we do not condone hate or violence of any kind, and I am pleased to see Tracy Morgan apologizing for recent homophobic remarks in his standup appearance... Unfortunately, Tracy's comments reflect negatively on both 30 Rock and NBC – two very all-inclusive and diverse organizations – and we have made it clear to him that this kind of behavior will not be tolerated." Tina Fey, Morgan's boss both in fiction and in real life, said, "I'm glad to hear that Tracy apologized .... but the violent imagery of Tracy's rant was disturbing to me at a time when homophobic hate crimes continue to be a life-threatening issue for the LGBT community...the Tracy Morgan I know, ...is not a hateful man and [would never] hurt another person. I hope for his sake that Tracy's apology will be accepted as sincere by his gay and lesbian co-workers at 30 Rock, without whom Tracy would not have lines to say, clothes to wear, sets to stand on, scene partners to act with or a printed-out paycheck from accounting to put in his pocket."

On June 25, 2011, during a show at Caroline's in New York City, Morgan made comments about disabled children, saying; "don't ever mess with women who have retarded kids," and referred to a woman as "a cripple." Peter Berns, CEO of The Arc, an organization supporting people with disabilities stated; "Tracy Morgan should apologize immediately. This quote is far too offensive to be excused as comedy, and it is very hurtful to people with intellectual and developmental disabilities and their families. Mr. Morgan has an incredibly powerful platform from which to fix this, and if he's learned anything in the last few weeks, he can't bomb this apology."

In 2012, Morgan's mother, Alicia Warden, said her Youngstown, Ohio, home was on the verge of foreclosure as a result of being laid off from her job the previous year. Her home value at the time was estimated to be $28,000, and her request for help from Morgan resulted in an offer of a one-time gift of $2,000, which she refused. Morgan responded in a statement; "I am saddened that these untrue stories about me have people questioning my commitment to my family. For reasons that are between us, I have not seen my mother in 11 years and outside of a random call here and there have had little to no contact with my sister. We all have personal family issues that we have to deal with in life, but I choose to deal with mine in private and not through the media." Warden also reportedly attempted to visit Morgan in the hospital shortly after his 2014 traffic accident, but was turned away by hospital security and Wollover (who became his wife in 2015). She said she returned the following day and was allowed five minutes with Morgan, who was still comatose at the time.

In June 2019, Morgan was involved in a minor collision in his newly purchased Bugatti Veyron with a female driver, and he was captured on video tapping on her window and yelling "bitch, get out of the car". According to Mercury News, the other driver was traumatized by Morgan's conduct. CBS News reporter visited Morgan to get his side of the story and Morgan allowed the reporter through his gate, answered the door himself, but refused to talk.

In August 2022, an anonymous woman who alleged SNL cast member Horatio Sanz groomed her and sexually assaulted her in 2002 when she was under the age of 18 requested that Morgan be added as a defendant in her lawsuit against Sanz, alleging he enabled Sanz's behavior.

Awards and nominations
 Emmy Awards
 2009, Outstanding Supporting Actor in a Comedy Series, 30 Rock, nominated 
 2016, Outstanding Guest Actor in a Comedy Series, Saturday Night Live, nominated
 Image Awards
 2007, Outstanding Supporting Actor in a Comedy Series, 30 Rock, nominated
 2008, Outstanding Supporting Actor in a Comedy Series, 30 Rock, nominated

Filmography

Film

Television

References

External links

 
 
 Interview with Tracy Morgan
 National Transportation Safety Board report on Morgan's 2014 accident
 

1968 births
Living people
20th-century African-American people
20th-century American comedians
20th-century American male actors
21st-century African-American people
21st-century American comedians
21st-century American male actors
African-American male actors
African-American male comedians
African-American stand-up comedians
American male comedians
American male film actors
American male television actors
American male voice actors
American sketch comedians
American stand-up comedians
Comedians from New York City
DeWitt Clinton High School alumni
Kidney transplant recipients
Male actors from New York City
People from Bedford–Stuyvesant, Brooklyn
People from Cresskill, New Jersey
People with traumatic brain injuries